Mohamed Ouda (born 27 January 1974) is an Egyptian football manager.

References

1974 births
Living people
Egyptian footballers
Al Mokawloon Al Arab SC players
Egyptian football managers
Al Mokawloon Al Arab SC managers
Al-Ahly SC (Benghazi) managers
Petrojet SC managers
Egyptian Premier League managers
Egyptian expatriate football managers
Expatriate football managers in Libya
Egyptian expatriate sportspeople in Libya
Association footballers not categorized by position